Möllen is a residential area in the district of Niewisch in Friedland in the district Oder-Spree (Brandenburg). It is close to Lake Schwielochsee, and at times it has been considered as one of the Schwielochsee villages.

History
The first historical mention of Möllen was in 1574 when it was in the possession of Joachim II. The name is most likely derived from the Sorb term měl = shallows.

Localities in Oder-Spree